Hormuz-2 (missile) (Persian: موشک هرمز-2) is an Iranian naval (strike) ballistic missile which is able to hit floating-targets at sea with high accuracy. The range of this Iranian missile is approximately 300 km. It was revealed in a defense exhibition on 11 May 2014 and is believed to be an Anti-radiation derivative of Fateh-110 tactical ballistic missile having Terminal guidance instead of Electro-Optical guidance.

In March 2017, it was reported that this domestically-made ballistic missile dubbed “Hormuz-2” was fired.

Hormuz-2's appearance is mentioned to be very similar to the missile of Persian Gulf (Khalije-Fars) which is a supersonic quasi ballistic anti-ship missile, which is reported to be able of targeting warships.

See also 
 Hormuz-1 (missile)
 Fateh-110
 Military of Iran
 Iranian military industry
 List of military equipment manufactured in Iran
 Science and technology in Iran
 DRDO Rudram
 Current Equipment of the Iranian Army
 Armed Forces of the Islamic Republic of Iran
 Aerospace Force of the Army of the Guardians of the Islamic Revolution
 Defense industry of Iran
 Equipment of the Iranian Army
 Great Prophet III (military exercise)
 Great Prophet IX

References 

Anti-ship missiles of Iran
Short-range ballistic missiles of Iran
Anti-ship cruise missiles
Anti-radiation missiles of Iran
Theatre ballistic missiles
Military equipment introduced in the 2010s